Román Chalbaud has been working in Venezuelan film, television, and theatre since 1951, continuing to direct, write, and produce works to the present. Though most famous for his Golden Age films, he is also renowned in Venezuela as part of the "Holy Trinity" of theater for his contributions not only in playwriting, but also in direction and production. Besides these, he has written and created many television series and telenovelas, and has occasionally acted in both his own and his contemporaries' works. Chalbaud's continuing work into his old age may be due to his affiliation with the successive Venezuelan governments, which have funded his works since such programs began.

Film

As director

As assistant director

As screenwriter

As producer

As actor

Television

Theatre

References

Chalbaud, Roman